Topless Women Talk About Their Lives is a 1997 New Zealand film about a group of twenty something friends.
It was based on a TV series.

Synopsis
After missing an abortion appointment Liz resigns herself to motherhood, but her boyfriend who is not the father is not so keen.

Cast

Reviews
 Cinemanilla Film Fest-Phillipines 2002 
 Cannes 1997 
 Summer School Film Festival-Czech Rep 2002 
 New Zealand Film Festival NY-USA 2001

Soundtrack

References

External links

Topless Women Talk About Their Lives at Urban Cinefile
Official website
Topless Women Talk About Their Lives at NZ Film Archive

1997 films
1990s New Zealand films
1990s English-language films
New Zealand comedy-drama films
Films directed by Harry Sinclair